University of Sciences is a university located inside the region of the National Academy of Science in Pyongyang, North Korea. INS is geographically located in Pyongsong, South Pyong'an Province, North Korea. However, North Korean government appointed the area of science district to belong to Pyongyang for giving some privileges of Pyongyang citizens to scientists of NAS and students of INS. As Kim Il-sung, a former leader of North Korea, emphasized the significance of education for gifted and talented students, INS originally started as a branch of Kim Il-sung University on January 17, 1962. It was separated from Kim Il-sung University in 1985. In North Korea, this university is known as "Sujae Daehark (University for talented students)". In South Korean mass media, this university is called "KAIST of North Korea".

Top students of natural sciences or engineering in North Korea study at this university supported totally by North Korean government. Eighty percent of them is graduated from No.1 Middle Schools, which are science high schools for gifted and talented students in North Korea, and the rest twenty percent are medal winners in the National Science Olympiads (math, physics, chemistry, and biology) or national science quiz contests. Unlike other universities in North Korea, students entering UNS have age limit. Equal or younger than 17 people are eligible to take entrance exam for INS.

It is known that many alums of this university are involved in projects for developing missiles and launching artificial earth satellites.

Departments
There are six departments in INS. Each department has five or six majors.

Physics
 Theoretical Physics
 Thermal Physics
 Solid State Physics

Mathematics
 Control Mathematics
 Applied Mathematics

Chemistry
 Theoretical Chemistry
 Inorganic Chemistry(material)
 Organic Chemistry
 Analytical Chemistry
 Laboratory of Applied Chemistry

Biology

Computer Engineering

Electrical Engineering

Mechanical Engineering
 Plasma and Hydrodynamics
 Mechanical Dynamics
 Solid Mechanics

Notable alumni

Academics
 Kim Ho (김호): Professor of Mathematics, University of Natural Science. He received his Doctoral degree in his twenties.
 Kim Ha (김하): Professor of Physics, University of Natural Science,
 Jang Hyekyung (장혜경): Professor of Mathematics, University of Natural Science
 Kim Seo-in (김서인): A former head of department in Math Institute of the National Academy of Science of North Korea, the youngest PhD recipient of North Korea.
 Kim Kwang-hyun (김광현): A scientist at Laser Institute of State Academy of Sciences of North Korea. He became a junior associate in the International Centre for Theoretical Physics (ICTP) in 2015.
 Joseph Han: A North Korean defector and a physicist. He earned a PhD degree in nuclear physics from Texas A&M University. He is the first North Korean defector to receive a doctorate from a university in the United States.

Business
 Lee Yun-keol (이윤걸): A North Korean defector and Chairman of NK Strategic Information Service Center 
 Lee Choong-kook (이충국): A North Korean defector. Director of Dandelion Oriental Medicine Clinic

Politics, Government and Public Service
 Kim Seung-du (김승두): Chairman of National Education Commission, North Korea 
 Lee Kwang-ho (리광호): Minister of Science Education Department, North Korea

See also
 List of universities in North Korea
 Pyongyang University of Science and Technology
 Education in North Korea

References

Education in Pyongyang
Universities in North Korea
1967 establishments in North Korea
20th-century architecture in North Korea